Ann Juliet Ace (born 27 June 1938) is a dramatist and screenwriter who contributed to EastEnders and The District Nurse. She also supplied many original scripts and dramatisations to BBC Radio drama, including The Archers. She wrote the screenplay for Cameleon, which won the Golden Spire Award for Best Dramatic Television Feature at the 1998 San Francisco International Film Festival.

Early life and teaching
Juliet Ace was the third daughter of Charles and Glenys Ace, born and raised in Llanelli, Carmarthenshire in South Wales. She was educated at Llanelli Girls' Grammar School, City of Coventry Training College, which was soon to become Coventry College of Education and be incorporated into the University of Warwick, where she specialised in drama and art. She then trained further at Rose Bruford College of Speech and Drama.

Ace taught for three years in St Mary Cray before joining a children's theatre company, and then working in weekly repertory at the Grand Theatre, Swansea for two seasons. In 1964, she began to work with children with special needs.

After her marriage to Richard Alexander in 1966 she moved to Dartmouth, Devon, where her husband worked as a civilian lecturer at the Britannia Royal Naval College. For the next 18 years she brought up their two children: Daniel Alexander, now a business consultant, and Catherine Alexander, a theatre director and drama teacher. Meanwhile, Ace continued working with special-needs children, privately and in local schools, and directed and acted with local drama groups.

Stage and radio
Juliet Ace began writing plays in 1976, after taking part in an Arvon Foundation writing course. In 1979 she won a Gulbenkian Foundation/Arts Council of Great Britain Award to work with professional directors and actors on new writing. As a result, her first play, Speak No Evil was produced first as a stage play in Bristol and then as a radio play, directed by Enyd Williams. It was nominated for a Pye Award

After her early work in radio, she moved into television, where she worked with Julia Smith and Tony Holland and was taken from The District Nurse series to the creation of the BBC's EastEnders, and then to the short-lived expatriate soap opera Eldorado.

While her dramatic imagination is rich – a leading character in the radio play Lobby Talk is a parrot – her background in life is also significant. Two successful sequences of radio dramas are uncommonly open semi-autobiographical journeys: first there is young Mattie Jones, growing up in South Wales, who appears as a child in The New Look: Tailor's Tacks, set in 1946, and then completes her growth into a teenager in 1955, four plays later, in Mattie and Bluebottle. An older Mattie, liberated by writing and performed by Patricia Hodge in four plays, starting with The Captain's Wife, and concluding with Upside Down in the Roasting Tin, is a testament to experience.

Juliet Ace tutored theatre undergraduates at Dartington College of Arts as a visiting playwright in 1985–87, and postgraduate students of writing and directing in the Media and Communications Department at Goldsmiths College in 1995–2005. She served as a judge of the Koestler Awards, for writing by prisoners, in the 1990s, and is a BAFTA jury member.

In 1988, her play A Slight Hitch was included in the Oxford University Press collection, New Plays, Volume 1, edited by Peter Terson, which included work by Terson, Arnold Wesker and Henry Livings. 

Ace's book about the actor Terence Rigby, Rigby Shlept Here: A Memoir of Terence Rigby 1937–2008, was published in November 2014, and the actor and director Peter Eyre described it in his review as "a fascinating and unusual memoir of a fascinating and unusual actor.... There is an unknown and detailed documentation of his work with Pinter, Peter Hall and Ian McKellen, among others, some of it quite shocking." A play for one woman. Directed by Nancy Meckler and performed by Cheryl Campbell. 20 May 2018. Purcell Room, Southbank Centre, London. Ace's alter ego, Mattie, offers a wry and searing late act as she relives five years of surviving cancer, with intact wits and minimal medical intervention, apart from an annoying and frustrating dependence on steroids – a witty refrain in the text.

Television series
The District Nurse (4 episodes ) 
Episode #1.9 (6 March 1984) 
Episode #2.6 (20 November 1984)
Episode #2.7 (27 November 1984)
A Terrible Itch (12 April 1987)
EastEnders - Twenty-five episodes including: 
Episode #1.26 (16 May 1985) Episode 26: Den and Angie decide to try to save their marriage and to end their respective affairs. 
Episode #1.60 (12 September 1985)
Episode #1.95 (14 January 1986) 
Episode #1.138 (12 June 1986)
Episode #1.201 (15 January 1987)
Episode dated 26 September 1989
EldoradoTwelve episodes for the expatriate BBC soap, beginning with Episode 13 shown on 3 August 1992

Films for television
Out of Order TV Movie BBC 2 directed by Prudence Fitzgerald starring Sarah Badel 1984
Llygad Y Ffynnon Feature-length film for the Welsh language station S4C directed by Huw Eirug. 23 October 1994.
Cameleon Prize-winning Welsh film directed by Ceri Sherlock with an award-winning performance by Aneirin Hughes. 1997 drama of a young soldier deserting in the Second World War to return to South Wales where he hides in the connected attics of a terrace of houses, adapting to the different households.

Journalism and publications
Tony Holland Obituary, The Guardian, 3 December 2007
Speak No Evil. Bristol Playwrights Company. 1981
New Plays, Volume 1 (ed. Peter Terson) OUP 
Rigby Shlept Here: A Memoir of Terence Rigby 1937-2008, 2014, ASIN: B00Q25491I

References

British dramatists and playwrights
British radio writers
Women radio writers
Welsh dramatists and playwrights
Welsh women dramatists and playwrights
People associated with Rose Bruford College
Living people
People from Llanelli
1938 births